Terayama (written: 寺山 lit. "temple mountain") is a Japanese surname. Notable people with the surname include:

, Japanese poet, dramatist, writer, film director and photographer
, Japanese footballer

Japanese-language surnames